Jayantibhai Kavadiya is an Indian politician. He was elected to the Gujarat Legislative Assembly from Dhrangadhra in the 2012 Gujarat Legislative Assembly election as a member of the Bharatiya Janata Party. He was sworn as Minister of State (Independent Charge) for Panchayat, Rural Housing and Rural Development, Co-operation in Anandiben Patel cabinet in 2014.

References

Living people
State cabinet ministers of Gujarat
People from Surendranagar district
1960 births
Gujarat MLAs 2012–2017
Bharatiya Janata Party politicians from Gujarat